The Jones Expedition of 1873 was a survey completed during the summer of 1873 with the official purpose of finding a wagon route between the Union Pacific Railroad in the southern part of the Wyoming Territory and Yellowstone National Park.

Captain William A. Jones led the expedition which included prominent scientists of the era, botanist Charles Parry and geologist Theodore Comstock as well chemists, topographers, astronomers, army infantry, eight wagons and 66 mules. The expedition was successful in discovering and documenting many features of western Wyoming including Togwotee Pass

Overview 
The expedition began on June 12, 1873 at Fort Bridger.

External links 
National Park Services Online

References

Yellowstone National Park
1873 in Wyoming Territory
Exploration of North America